Minnesota Aurora FC is an American women's soccer club based in Eagan, Minnesota that plays in the Heartland Division of the USL W League. The club began play in the league's inaugural 2022 season as a founding club. The club is community-owned by 3,080 individuals. The club plays its home games at TCO Stadium in Eagan, Minnesota, the same stadium the Minnesota Vikings use for practice.

History 
Minnesota Aurora FC officially sold out their ownership sales on December 15, 2021. The team introduced their coaching staff a few days later, naming Nicole Lukic as the head coach and ensuring the team would be women-led. The team held tryouts during the spring of 2022 and in May the team announced a partnership with local broadcaster WCCO to stream all home games for free. The team held their first game at TCO Stadium on May 26, 2022 against Green Bay Glory. The game resulted in a draw but the Minnesota team 5,219 fans. Their first win would be against Kaw Valley on June 2.

On October 24, 2022, the club sent a letter to its community owners stating an intent to become a fully professional team. The Aurora would continue to play in the USL W League through the 2023 season, possibly moving to National Women's Soccer League (NWSL) or the USL Super League in 2024. The club announced their intent to submit an official expansion bid for the NWSL in November.

Branding
The crest of Minnesota Aurora FC features a stylized Aurora swooping above a forest with a star hanging to the right. The inspiration for the design came from Minnesota's northern geographic identity and nickname of the North Star State. The crest was designed by local designer Nicole Meyer, along with help from colleagues Allie Reinke and Carla Zetina-Yglesias. The crest was originally one of three designs, all of which were voted on by the community members. Other names for the new team included Arctic Minnesota and Minnesota Foxfire FC, all designed by Meyer, Reinke, and Zetina-Yglesias.

The kit worn by MN Aurora FC was designed by Cassidy Sepnieski and was revealed on April 9, 2022. Manufactured by Hummel International, the home kit features a dark background with a borealis swirling in the center. The away kit is bright teal, with interlinking stars forming constellations. The goalkeeper kit is "flash red" and also sports the same constellation pattern as the away kit.

Club culture

Players and staff

Roster

Management

Coaching staff
 Nicole Lukic – head coach
 Jennie Clark – assistant coach
 Jen Larrik – assistant coach

Record

Year-by-year

Head coaches
 Includes Regular Season and Playoffs. Excludes friendlies.

Honors
  USL W League
 Regular Season Champions: 2022
 Heartland Division Winner: 2022

Player honors

References

External links 
 

Soccer clubs in Minneapolis–Saint Paul
Association football clubs established in 2021
2021 establishments in Minnesota
USL W League teams